Paul Henry Ramirez (born 1963 in El Paso, Texas, U.S.) is an American contemporary artist known for his biomorphic abstractionist paintings. As his figural based paintings evolved to include geometrics, in 2010, Ramirez coined the term "biogeomorphic abstraction" to describe his own bold painting style, a fusion of biomorphic and geometric forms. He also gained notability for his site-specific installations as his paintings began to expand outside the confines of the canvas edges onto the walls of the gallery space. These site-specific installations gradually evolved to encompass the whole gallery space, creating a full environmental experience. Donald Kuspit, scholar and art critic, describes Ramirez as “an important new kind of abstract painter . . . an abstractionist playing with color and form to exciting imaginative effect.”

Work
Ramirez began creating site-specific installations in 1994, combining drawings, paintings, objects, sculpture, music, dance, and furniture in dialogue with architectural space and architectural elements, sometimes in collaboration with sound designers, dance choreographers, costume designers, and furniture designers. His "total environments" are intended to invite viewers to experience in addition to observe, to feel as if “they are coming into the belly of a painting” as they enter his world — his installation. These were first featured in New York City alternative exhibition spaces including the Drawing Center (1994), Clock Tower Gallery (1995) and Franklin Furnace (1995); and at Caren Golden Fine Art, New York (1998).

Career
Ramirez moved from his native Texas to New Jersey in 1985, then to New York City a few years later to design window and interior displays for retailers Henri Bendel, Charivari, and Takashimaya. In 1994, he set up a studio in the Greenpoint neighborhood of Brooklyn, NY, later moving his studio to the Motor Arts Building studio complex at the Grounds For Sculpture, Hamilton, New Jersey. He is represented by Ryan Lee Gallery, New York.

Exhibits and collections
Ramirez has exhibited his work throughout the United States and Europe since 1982, including at Museo de Arte de Ciudad Juárez (1982), The Contemporary Austin (1997), Brooklyn Museum of Art (1997), Bronx Museum of Art (1997), Aldrich Contemporary Art Museum (1998), Corcoran Gallery of Art (2000), Museo del Barrio (2000), Cincinnati Museum of Art (2001), Whitney Museum of American Art (2002), Newark Museum (2011), Museo de Arte de Ponce (2012), and Smithsonian American Art Museum (2013).

His work can be found in the permanent collections of the Austin Museum of Art, Corcoran Gallery of Art, Crocker Art Museum, El Paso Museum of Art, Hammer Museum, Hirshhorn Museum, Kresge Art Museum, Newark Museum, Smithsonian American Art Museum, Smithsonian’s National Air and Space Museum, Tarble Arts Center, The Hyde Collection, and Whitney Museum of American Art.

Solo museum exhibitions 
2016. "RATTLE," Grounds For Sculpture; curated by Tom Moran, Hamilton, New Jersey; brochure.
2010. “Blackout: A Centennial Commission,” Newark Museum; curated by Evelyn Carmen Ramos, Newark, New Jersey; brochure.
2004. “Seriously Playful: Paul Henry Ramirez, 1995-2004," Stanlee and Gerald Rubin Gallery, curated by Kate Bonansiga, University of Texas, El Paso; catalog.   
2002–2003. “Elevatious Transcendsualistic,” Tang Teaching Museum, curated by Ian Berry, Saratoga Springs, New York; catalog.
2002. Space Addiction, Whitney Museum of American Art at Philip Morris; curated by Shamim M. Momin, New York, New York; brochure.
2001. “Elevatious Transcendsualistic,” Contemporary Arts Center, curated by Sue Spaid, Cincinnati, Ohio.  
1982. “Golden Girls,” Museo de Arte de Ciudad Juárez, curated by Arq. José Diego Lizárraga, Ciudad Juárez, Chihuahua, Mexico.

References

External links
Paul Henry Ramirez official website.
RYAN LEE Gallery official website.

Living people
20th-century American painters
American male painters
21st-century American painters
21st-century American male artists
1963 births
20th-century American male artists